Dera Murad Jamali railway station (Balochi: ڈیرہ مراد جمالی ریلوے اسٹیشن), formerly known as Temple Dera railway station, is located in Dera Murad Jamali city, Nasirabad district of Balochistan province of the Pakistan.

Services
The following trains stop at Dera Murad Jamali station:

See also
 List of railway stations in Pakistan
 Pakistan Railways

References

Railway stations in Nasirabad District
Railway stations on Rohri–Chaman Railway Line